Werauhia kupperiana is a plant species in the genus Werauhia. This species is native to Costa Rica and Ecuador.

Cultivars
 × Vrierauhia 'Gladys Aono'

References

BSI Cultivar Registry Retrieved 11 October 2009

kupperiana
Flora of Costa Rica
Flora of Ecuador